North Wales Rugby (Welsh: Rygbi Gogledd Cymru) was a representative rugby union team representing Wales. They competed annually in the Welsh County Championship and represented the region against international touring teams including Tonga, Romania, Japan and Western Samoa.

At age grade level they competed twice against the touring New Zealand under-21 side.

The first notable player from North Wales was D.M.Johnston of the ship school HMS Conway on Anglesey, who toured South Africa in 1956 with Welsh Schoolboys. The tour party, who lost one game on the eight match tour, included Clive Rowlands who went on to gain senior Wales caps.

In December 2009 at a Welsh Rugby Union press conference held at Ruthin Castle they were formally replaced by the new developmental regional rugby union team for north Wales RGC 1404.

Partial list of games played against international opposition

North Wales international players

 Jake Ball
 Dewi Bebb
 Ian Buckett
 Alex Cuthbert
 Godfrey Darbishire
 Arthur Emyr
 Tony Gray
 James King
 Robin McBryde 
 Rob McCusker
 Andrew Moore
 Steve Moore
 Bill Morris
 George North
 Meirion Roberts
 Mike Roberts
 Stuart Roy
 Charles Taylor
 Hugh Vincent
 Dorian West
 Mark Williams
 Wilf Wooller

References

Defunct Welsh rugby union teams